This is the discography of American group the 5th Dimension.

Albums

Studio albums

Live albums

Compilation albums

Singles

References

External links

Discographies of American artists
Pop music group discographies
Rhythm and blues discographies
Soul music discographies